Jahelu may refer to:
 Jahelu, Hormozgan
 Jahelu, Sistan and Baluchestan